This is a complete list of all the singles that entered the VG-lista, the official Norwegian hit-chart, in 1963. A total of 65 singles appeared on the VG-lista that year and these are all listed below according to how well they have charted over time.

Top 1963
 Arne Bendiksen - "Jeg vil ha en blå ballong"
 Cliff Richard - "Summer Holiday"
 Ned Miller - "From a Jack to a King"
 Cliff Richard - "Lucky Lips"
 Elvis Presley - "(You're the) Devil in Disguise"
 Kyu Sakamoto - "Sukiyaki"
 Wenche Myhre - "Gi meg en cowboy til mann"
 Bobby Bare - "Detroit City"
 Cliff Richard - "Don't Talk to Him"

Top singles of 1963

External links 
 VG-Lista - the official Norwegian hit-chart
 VG-lista - Top 100 singles of all time in Norway

Norwegian record charts
1963 record charts
1963 in Norway
Norwegian music-related lists